Anatella is a genus of flies belonging to the family Mycetophilidae.

The genus was first described by Johannes Winnertz in 1863.

The species of this genus are found in Eurasia and Northern America.

Species:

 Anatella affinis Fisher, 1938
 Anatella alpina Plassmann, 1977
 Anatella altaica Zaitzev, 1989
 Anatella aquila Zaitzev, 1989
 Anatella arnaudi Zaitzev, 2000
 Anatella atlanticiliata Chandler & Ribeiro, 1995
 Anatella bremia Chandler, 1994
 Anatella brevifurca Strobl, 1901
 Anatella ciliata Winnertz, 1863
 Anatella clavata Ostroverkhova, 1979
 Anatella coheri Wu & Yang, 1995
 Anatella concava Plassmann, 1990
 Anatella crispa Zaitzev, 1994
 Anatella damfi Landrock, 1924
 Anatella dentata Zaitzev, 1989
 Anatella difficilis Garrett, 1925
 Anatella digitata Zaitzev, 1989
 Anatella dissecta Ostroverkhova, 1979
 Anatella emergens Caspers, 1987
 Anatella flavicauda Winnertz, 1863
 Anatella flavomaculata Edwards, 1925
 Anatella fungina Plassmann, 1984
 Anatella gibba Winnertz, 1863
 Anatella laffooni Plassmann, 1977
 Anatella latilobata Zaitzev, 1989
 Anatella lenis Dziedzicki, 1923
 Anatella longiflagellata Caspers, 1991
 Anatella longisetosa Dziedzicki, 1923
 Anatella maritima Ostroverkhova, 1979
 Anatella mendosa Zaitzev, 2000
 Anatella minutissima Ostroverkhova, 1979
 Anatella nigriclava Strobl, 1895
 Anatella novata Dziedzicki, 1923
 Anatella orbiculata Ostroverkhova & Izotov, 1974
 Anatella pseudogibba Plassmann, 1977
 Anatella ramificata Zaitzev, 1989
 Anatella rufithorax Strobl, 1895
 Anatella scalaria Ostroverkhova, 1979
 Anatella schmitzi Landrock, 1925
 Anatella setigera Edwards, 1921
 Anatella silvestris Johannsen, 1909
 Anatella simpatica Dziedzicki, 1923
 Anatella stimulea Plassmann, 1977
 Anatella subulata Zaitzev, 1994
 Anatella tungusica Ostroverkhova, 1979
 Anatella turi Dziedzicki, 1923
 Anatella umbraculiforma Ostroverkhova, 1974
 Anatella unguigera Edwards, 1921

References

Mycetophilidae